Just Me may refer to:

Music albums
 Just Me (Brian McKnight album), 2011
 Just Me (Keith Sweat album), 2008
 Just Me (Sarah Geronimo album), 2008
 Just Me (Tiffany album), 2007
 Just Me (Tina Arena album), 2001
 Just Me (Davy Jones album), 2001
 Just Me (Clive Palmer album), 1978

Other
 Just Me (fragrance), a Parlux Fragrances fragrance endorsed by Paris Hilton